Harold Davenport FRS (30 October 1907 – 9 June 1969) was an English mathematician, known for his extensive work in number theory.

Early life
Born on 30 October 1907 in Huncoat, Lancashire, Davenport was educated at Accrington Grammar School, the University of Manchester (graduating in 1927), and Trinity College, Cambridge. He became a research student of John Edensor Littlewood, working on the question of the distribution of quadratic residues.

First steps in research

Bounds for the zeroes of the local zeta-function immediately imply bounds for sums , where χ is the Legendre symbol modulo a prime number p, and the sum is taken over a complete set of residues mod p.

In the light of this connection it was appropriate that, with a Trinity research fellowship, Davenport in 1932–1933 spent time in Marburg and Göttingen working with Helmut Hasse, an expert on the algebraic theory. This produced the work on the Hasse–Davenport relations for Gauss sums, and contact with Hans Heilbronn, with whom Davenport would later collaborate. In fact, as Davenport later admitted, his inherent prejudices against algebraic methods ("what can you do with algebra?") probably limited the amount he learned, in particular in the "new" algebraic geometry and Artin/Noether approach to abstract algebra.

Later career
He took an appointment at the University of Manchester in 1937, just at the time when Louis Mordell had recruited émigrés from continental Europe to build an outstanding department. He moved into the areas of diophantine approximation and geometry of numbers. These were fashionable, and complemented the technical expertise he had in the Hardy-Littlewood circle method; he was later, though, to let drop the comment that he wished he'd spent more time on the Riemann hypothesis.

He was President of the London Mathematical Society from 1957 to 1959. After professorial positions at the University of Wales and University College London, he was appointed to the Rouse Ball Chair of Mathematics in Cambridge in 1958. There he remained until his death, of lung cancer.

Personal life
Davenport married Anne Lofthouse, whom he met at the University College of North Wales at Bangor in 1944; they had two children, Richard and James, the latter going on to become Hebron and Medlock Professor of Information Technology at the University of Bath.

Influence
From about 1950, Davenport was the obvious leader of a "school", somewhat unusually in the context of British mathematics. The successor to the school of mathematical analysis of G. H. Hardy and J. E. Littlewood, it was also more narrowly devoted to number theory, and indeed to its analytic side, as had flourished in the 1930s. This implied problem-solving, and hard-analysis methods. The outstanding works of Klaus Roth and Alan Baker exemplify what this can do, in diophantine approximation.  Two reported sayings, "the problems are there", and "I don't care how you get hold of the gadget, I just want to know how big or small it is", sum up the attitude, and could be transplanted today into any discussion of combinatorics.  This concrete emphasis on problems stood in sharp contrast with the abstraction of Bourbaki, who were then active just across the English Channel.

Books
The Higher Arithmetic: An Introduction to the Theory of Numbers (1952)
Analytic methods for Diophantine equations and Diophantine inequalities (1962); 
Multiplicative number theory (1967)<ref>{{cite journal|author=Stark, H. M.|author-link=Harold Stark|title=Review: Introduction to analytic number theory, by K. Chandrasekharan; Arithmetical functions, by K. Chandrasekharan; Multiplicative number theory, by Harold Davenport; Sequences, by H. Halberstam and K. F. Roth|journal=Bull. Amer. Math. Soc.|year=1971|volume=77|issue=6|pages=943–957|url=https://www.ams.org/journals/bull/1971-77-06/S0002-9904-1971-12812-4/S0002-9904-1971-12812-4.pdf|doi=10.1090/S0002-9904-1971-12812-4}}</ref>
 2nd edition (revised by Hugh L. Montgomery) The collected works of Harold Davenport'' (1977) in four volumes, edited by B. J. Birch, H. Halberstam, C. A. Rogers

References

20th-century English mathematicians
Number theorists
Fellows of the Royal Society
Academics of the University of Wales
Academics of University College London
Academics of the Victoria University of Manchester
Alumni of the Victoria University of Manchester
Alumni of Trinity College, Cambridge
Fellows of Trinity College, Cambridge
1907 births
1969 deaths
Deaths from lung cancer in England
People educated at Accrington Grammar School
People from Accrington
Rouse Ball Professors of Mathematics (Cambridge)